Tyson's Run is a 2022 American drama film written and directed by Kim Bass and starring Rory Cochrane, Amy Smart, Major Dodson and Barkhad Abdi.

Premise
An unathletic autistic boy strives to become an unlikely marathon champion giving his unfulfilled father purpose and a second chance at putting his family first.

Cast
 Major Dodson as Tyson
 Rory Cochrane as Coach
 Amy Smart as Eloise
 Layla Felder as Shannon
 Claudia Zevallos as Fernandez
 Reno Wilson as Mayor
 Barkhad Abdi as Aklilu
 Jibre Hordges as Billy Kidman

Production
Principal photography began in Atlanta on July 9, 2018.  Filming also occurred in Marietta, Georgia.

Release
The film was released in select theaters on March 11, 2022.

Reception
In the United States and Canada, the film earned $212,800 from 428 theaters in its opening weekend.

Rick Bentley of KGET-TV awarded the film two and a half stars and wrote, "As a sports movie dealing with marathon running, Tyson’s Run hits the wall in the first act as it just never finds the proper stride or pacing. It does get a few more miles out of the family elements."
On review aggregator website Rotten Tomatoes, the film holds an approval rating of 60% based on 5 reviews, with an average rating of 6.10/10.

References

External links
 
 
 

American drama films
Films shot in Atlanta
2020s English-language films
2020s American films